Jolanda Keizer (born 5 April 1985 in Amsterdam, North Holland) is a Dutch heptathlete.

Achievements

References

External links
 
 Official website, archived on 23 April 2012 

1985 births
Living people
Dutch heptathletes
Athletes (track and field) at the 2008 Summer Olympics
Olympic athletes of the Netherlands
Athletes from Amsterdam